Dmitry Pozharsky was a  of the Soviet Navy.

Development and design 

The Sverdlov-class cruisers, Soviet designation Project 68bis, were the last conventional gun cruisers built for the Soviet Navy. They were built in the 1950s and were based on Soviet, German, and Italian designs and concepts developed prior to the Second World War. They were modified to improve their sea keeping capabilities, allowing them to run at high speed in the rough waters of the North Atlantic. The basic hull was more modern and had better armor protection than the vast majority of the post Second World War gun cruiser designs built and deployed by peer nations. They also carried an extensive suite of modern radar equipment and anti-aircraft artillery. The Soviets originally planned to build 40 ships in the class, which would be supported by the s and aircraft carriers.

The Sverdlov class displaced 13,600 tons standard and 16,640 tons at full load. They were  long overall and  long at the waterline. They had a beam of  and draught of  and typically had a complement of 1,250. The hull was a completely welded new design and the ships had a double bottom for over 75% of their length. The ship also had twenty-three watertight bulkheads. The Sverdlovs had six boilers providing steam to two shaft geared steam turbines generating . This gave the ships a maximum speed of . The cruisers had a range of  at .

Sverdlov-class cruisers main armament included twelve /57 cal B-38 guns mounted in four triple Mk5-bis turrets. They also had twelve /56 cal Model 1934 guns in six twin SM-5-1 mounts. For anti-aircraft weaponry, the cruisers had thirty-two  anti-aircraft guns in sixteen twin mounts and were also equipped with ten  torpedo tubes in two mountings of five each.

The Sverdlovs had   belt armor and had a   armored deck. The turrets were shielded by  armor and the conning tower, by  armor.

The cruisers' ultimate radar suite included one 'Big Net' or 'Top Trough' air search radar, one 'High Sieve' or 'Low Sieve' air search radar, one 'Knife Rest' air search radar and one 'Slim Net' air search radar. For navigational radar they had one 'Don-2' or 'Neptune' model. For fire control purposes the ships were equipped with two 'Sun Visor' radars, two 'Top Bow' 152 mm gun radars and eight 'Egg Cup' gun radars. For electronic countermeasures the ships were equipped with two 'Watch Dog' ECM systems.

Construction and career
The ship was built at Baltic Shipyard in Leningrad and was launched on 25 June 1953 and commissioned into the Northern Fleet on 31 December 1954.

On 31 January 1955, she entered the 4th Navy. Then on 24 February, she was transferred to the Northern Fleet. On 7 September, after crossing the Northern Sea Route from Severomorsk to the Far East, he was transferred to Pacific Fleet.

On 21–26 June 1956, she visited Shanghai.

In 1964, having on board the cadets, she completed a cruise along the route: the Sea of Japan, the East China Sea, the South China Sea, the Philippine Sea and returned to Vladivostok through the Sangar Strait.

From 29–31 March 1968, she visited Madras and from 3–6 April, she visited Bombay. From 17–24 April, she visited to Mogadishu. From 11–19 May, she visited to Umm Qasr, Iraq. From 25 May to 2 June, she visited Karachi and from 5–9 June, she visited to Bandar Abbas. From 25–28 June, she visited to Aden and lastly from 6–11 July, she visited to Colombo.

From 25 April 1969 to 23 October 1970, she underwent overhaul at Dalzavod in Vladivostok.

In 1971, a cruise with cadets along the previous 1964 cruise's route.

From 10 November 1974 to 10 June 1975, she was on active duty in the Indian Ocean. Tracking the aircraft carrier USS Constellation. Visits Madras, Mogadishu, Aden, Port Louis.

Arriving in Port Louis, the ship's crew from February 15 to March 1, 1975, together with the PM-125, provided assistance to its population, which suffered from the consequences of the tropical hurricane Gervaise, for two weeks.

From June to July 1977, naval practice of 1st-year cadets named after S.O. Makarova. They went around Japan, through the Korean Strait, then with a call to Sovetskaya Gavan (stay for 3 days) and back to Vladivostok through the fourth Kuril Strait and through the La Pérouse Strait.

On 30 January 1979, she was put into repair at Dalzavod in Vladivostok.

On 5 March 1987, she was disarmed and decommissioned from the Navy. On 16 September, she was struck by the navy. 

In 1990, she was sold to a private Indian firm for scrap in India.

Pennant numbers

Gallery

See also 
Cruiser
Sverdlov-class cruiser
List of ships of the Soviet Navy
List of ships of Russia by project number

References

Ships built at the Baltic Shipyard
Sverdlov-class cruisers
Ships of the Soviet Navy
1953 ships
Cold War cruisers of the Soviet Union